Beckerella may refer to:
 Beckerella, a genus of flies in the family Chloropidae, synonym of Trigonomma
 Beckerella, a genus of springtails in the family Hypogastruridae, synonym of Choreutinula
 Beckerella, a genus of algae in the family Gelidiaceae, synonym of Ptilophora